Beedeina is an extinct genus of fusulinid belonging to the family Fusulinidae. These have been found in rock strata from the Moscovian Stage.

References 

Paleozoic life
Fusulinida